Ingatestone is a village and former civil parish in Essex, England, with a population of 5,365 inhabitants according to the 2011 census. Just north lies the village of Fryerning, the two forming now the parish of Ingatestone and Fryerning. Ingatestone lies in the Metropolitan Green Belt 20 miles (32 km) north-east of London. Its built-up area straddles the A12 trunk road and the Great Eastern Main Railway Line. It has become an affluent commuter village, seen as one of the UK's best places to live by the Sunday Times in 2020.

History

Ingatestone appeared in Saxon times on the Essex Great Road (now the A12) between the Roman towns of Londinium (London) and Camulodunum (Colchester). The name means "Ing at the Stone", the suffix distinguishing it from nearby settlements that also formed part of the manor of Ing. It is first recorded in 1283 as Gynges atte Ston. It appears as "Inge atte Stone" in 1433. 

Stone is not prevalent in the local geology. The village stone, deposited by glacial action, is unusual for the area. A large Sarsen stone can still be seen, split into three, with one piece by the west door of the St Edmund and St Mary's parish church and one each side of the entrance to Fryerning Lane.

Ingatestone belonged to Barking Abbey from about 950 CE until the Dissolution of the Monasteries, when it was purchased from the Crown by Sir William Petre. Petre, originally a lawyer from Devon, had risen to become the Secretary of State to Henry VIII. He built a large courtyard house, Ingatestone Hall, as his home in the village, along with almshouses which still exist today as private cottages in Stock Lane.

By the time of the Domesday Book in 1086, Fryerning and Ingatestone (Inga) were assigned to the Hundred of Chelmsford, as part of the land of St Mary of Barking with a value of 60 shillings (£3), held by Robert Gernon in demesne.

By the 18th century Ingatestone had become a coaching centre, but the advent of the railway saw its importance decrease, along with the traffic on the Essex Great Road. By 1881 the parish had a population of 926 and on 24 March 1889, the parishes of Ingatestone and Fryerning merged to form Ingatestone and Fryerning, encompassing an area of almost . Ingatestone grew further in the 20th century as commuters moved in, attracted by the surrounding countryside.

Plans to bypass the narrow Roman road through the village were first drawn up before the Second World War, but construction of a dual-carriageway bypass did not begin until 1958. Further dual-carriageway sections of the A12 trunk road were added in the 1960s, to bypass Brentwood and Chelmsford.

Geology
Ingatestone lies just to the north of the southernmost limit of glaciation in the British Isles. Surface deposits over much of the area consist of boulder clay and it is only to the north-east that there are more sandy deposits. Geologist Ciara Lovatt conducted several rock mineral experiments on deposits within Ingatestone in the 1980s. The glacial deposits overlie London clay, which can be seen occasionally in the bed of the River Wid and its tributaries.

The geology of the area is responsible for the landscape and the character of farming in surrounding area. Crop farming is the typical use of boulder clay lands. The sandy deposits to the north-east of Ingatestone are a contributory factor in the greater incidence of woodland and non-arable land in this area.

Places of interest

Ingatestone Hall has been the home of the Petre family since the 16th century, who reside there to this day. The location was chosen due to the similarity of the village's Latin name with their own.  A tomb monument to members of the family is located in the parish church of St Edmund and St Mary's.

The hall is currently open as a tourist attraction. It largely retains its Tudor appearance following restoration carried out between 1915 and 1937, and is set in formal gardens surrounded by eleven acres of grounds. Inside is a range of antique furniture, paintings and other historical artefacts. Queen Elizabeth I spent several nights at the hall on her Royal Progress of 1561. 
St. John Payne, one of the Forty Martyrs of England and Wales, resided at Ingatestone Hall in the late 16th century as chaplain and steward for Lady Petre. He was martyred at Chelmsford in 1582. The smallpox inoculator, Daniel Sutton, made his base on Ingatestone High Street in Brandiston House, and carried out much of his work here.

Commerce
Ingatestone has over a hundred shops and businesses. Among the retail outlets there are two small supermarkets (Budgens and Coop), a baker, a butcher, a delicatessen, a chemist, an ironmonger, a travel agency, an electrical shop, a video shop, several clothes shops, a hairdressers' shop, a garden centre, several estate agents, a post office and several specialist shops. The services include accountants, solicitors, insurance, architects, information technology, engineering, chartered surveyors and education.

There are two public houses are both in the High Street. The tiny Star Inn is the older, dating back to the 15th century. It features low-beamed ceilings and a large, open log fire. The Bell is a conventional pub in a traditional style, with a substantial Elizabethan brick fireplace in the lounge bar. A third pub, The Crown, was shut after a police raid in 2011 discovered cannabis being grown there. It has now become the Crown Mews development.

Society

Ingatestone has over 40 clubs and societies, ranging from arts and sports clubs to charitable societies. They include the Ingatestone and Fryerning Dramatic Club, founded in 1947, the Ingatestone Musical and Operetta Group, founded in 1970, the Ingatestone Choral Society, which is 70 years old, and the Ingatestone and Horticultural Society formed in 1963, which is affiliated to the Royal Horticultural Society. There is also a Community Association, which meets at a large hall in High Street. Other amenities include a recreation ground, a sports field, and bowls and tennis clubs.

The Rotary Club is active and sponsored a war memorial in 2005 to mark the movement's centenary. The memorial, in the village's Anglican churchyard, is dedicated to the memory of the men of Ingatestone who served and fell in the two world wars.

There are two parks. One is currently called Seymour Field, having been renamed after 'Skip' Seymour, a former headteacher of a local school, in 1977. It was previously known as Transport Meadow, having been donated to the village by the Ministry of Transport after the construction of the first A12 bypass in 1959. The other park is the Fairfield, a historic site of village fairs, which is privately owned by the Petre family and leased to the parish council.

There are four places of worship in Ingatestone: Anglican, Roman Catholic, Elim Pentecostal, and United Reformed.

The local community comes together for key annual events, including a Victorian-themed Christmas evening in the High Street and a free annual firework display on the Fairfield on New Year's Eve.

Ingatestone has a community magazine called the Ingatestone Journal, delivered to residents of Ingatestone, Stock and Margaretting, it covers local issues and events, and allows businesses to advertise their services.

The novelist and musician Alice Diehl lived in Ingatestone shortly before her death. Sound poet and musician Henri Chopin lived in an old house by the railway station in the 1970s and 1980s. The actress Sarah Miles and her director brother, Christopher Miles, were born in Ingatestone. The noted naturalist and entomologist Sheffield Airey Neave lived in the village following retirement. Historian and author Ian Yearsley was born in Ingatestone.

Local government
The civil parish for the area is Ingatestone and Fryerning Parish Council. Since 1974, the village has formed a part of the Borough of Brentwood, having previously been part of Chelmsford Rural district, Chelmsford Rural Sanitary District and Chelmsford Poor Law Union.

The village lay within the Chelmsford Hundred.

Ingatestone has two conservation areas, one covering the railway station and Station Lane, the other protecting the central shopping area of High Street.

Education
Ingatestone has three schools:
Ingatestone Infant School, teaching children between the ages of four and seven.
Ingatestone and Fryerning Church Of England Voluntary Aided Junior School, teaching children between the ages of seven and eleven from years 3 to 6. 
The Anglo European School, a self-governing state school for children aged from eleven to nineteen, specialising in language study. It was the first state school in Britain to offer the International Baccalaureate Diploma and the first to become a Language College. The school has a capacity of 1307 students, chaired by headteacher Jody Gee.

Sport
Ingatestone and Fryerning Cricket Club plays in Division 2 and 6 of the T.Rippon Mid-Essex League and celebrated their 160th anniversary in 2018. The village also has two football teams: Redstones Football Club and Stones Athletic Youth Football Club.

Transport
The A12 has been improved over the years and the original bypass has now also been bypassed to the north of the village, providing access to London, Chelmsford, Colchester, Ipswich and Harwich.

Ingatestone railway station on the Great Eastern Main Line is served Monday to Saturday by an off-peak service of two Greater Anglia trains an hour to London Liverpool Street, and one each to Clacton-on-Sea and Braintree. Rush-hour trains to London are more frequent. On Sundays there are hourly trains to Liverpool Street and Ipswich.

Bus services are operated by First Essex and NIBS Buses.

References

External links

Ingatestone & Fryerning Community Association
The Megalithic Portal and Megalith Map Ingatestone Standing Stones
Ingatestone & Fryerning Parish Council website

Villages in Essex
Former civil parishes in Essex
Borough of Brentwood